Charles Thomas Weatherby (7 May 1860 – 24 June 1913) was an English first-class cricketer and publisher.

The eldest son of Edward Weatherby, he was born at Kensington in May 1860. He was educated at Winchester College, where he played for the cricket eleven. He was described by Lillywhite's Companion as "a fair bat and field" while at Winchester. From Winchester he went up to New College, Oxford. He played cricket for New College, but did not represent Oxford University Cricket Club in first-class cricket. He did however play one first-class match for the Marylebone Cricket Club against Oxford University in 1882, a year after his graduation from New College. He batted twice in the match, being dismissed for scores of 1 and 15 by Edward Peake and Charles Godfrey respectively. After graduating from Oxford, he worked for the family business, Weatherby & Sons, which was responsible for publishing the Racing Calendar. Weatherby died suddenly in June 1913 at Lindfield, Sussex. His brothers, Francis and John, both played first-class cricket, as did his nephew John Atkinson-Clark.

References

External links

1860 births
1913 deaths
Sportspeople from Kensington
People educated at Winchester College
Alumni of New College, Oxford
English cricketers
Marylebone Cricket Club cricketers
Publishers (people) from London
19th-century English businesspeople